Gigantactis meadi is a species of fish in the whipnose angler (Gigantactinidae) family, first described in 1981 by Erik Bertelsen, Theodore Wells Pietsch III and Robert J. Lavenberg. The genus name, Gigantactis, derives from the Greek, gigas (gigantic ) and aktis (ray), describing the fish by its long dorsal-fin spine which serves as a lure. 

It has six dorsal soft rays and six anal soft rays.

It is found in the bottom ocean waters in seas off Argentina, Australia, Brazil, Chile, the Falkland Islands, French Southern Territories, Heard Island and McDonald Islands, New Zealand, Norfolk Island, Saint Helena, Tristan da Cunha, South Africa, South Georgia, the South Sandwich Islands and Uruguay,  at depths of 1,213 metres to 2,000 metres. In Australia it is found in waters south of Tasmania.

References

Further reading

Stewart, A.L. and Pietsch, T.W. 2015. Family Gigantactinidae. In: Roberts, C., Stewart, A.L. and Struthers, C.D. (eds), The Fishes of New Zealand, pp. 932-936. Te Papa Press.

Deep sea fish
Bioluminescent fish
Taxa named by Theodore Wells Pietsch III
Fish described in 1981
Gigantactinidae
Taxa named by Erik Bertelsen